The Democratic Party leadership election was held on 17 December 2006 for the 30-member 7th Central Committee of the Democratic Party in Hong Kong, including chairman and two vice-chairman posts. Legislative Council member and party's Vice-Chairman Albert Ho from the mainstreamer faction defeated the incumbent Vice-Chairman Chan King-ming from the Young Turks faction with a large margin, succeeding Lee Wing-tat as the chairman of the party.

Eligibility
The Central Committee was elected by the party congress. All public office holders, including the members of the Legislative Council and District Councils, are eligible to vote in the party congress. Every 30 members can also elect a delegate who holds one vote in the congress.

Overview
The Democratic Party was suffering from the intra-party factional struggles between the mainstreamers and Young Turk reformists, while it was also facing the external challenge from the newly established Civic Party from the same pan-democracy camp.

In March, 2006, the Mainstreamer faction alleged that some senior members were involved in spying activities of China. The "suspects" were all Young Turks Reformist members including vice-chairman and chairman of the New Territories East branch Chan King-ming and District Councillor Gary Fan Kwok-wai in New Territories East.

On 27 November, the incumbent vice-chairman and legislative council member Albert Ho announced he would run for the chairman post with a cabinet list, including legislative council member Sin Chung-kai and Central Committee member Tik Chi-yuen running for the two vice-chairman posts, Peggy Ha Ving-vung for the secretary post and Cheung Yin-tung for the treasurer post.

Supported by the reformist Young Turks faction, another incumbent vice-chairman, Chan King-ming, ran for the chairman for the second time after his defeat by Lee Wing-tat in the last party leadership election in 2004.

Elections

Results
The mainstreamer legislator Albert Ho defeated reformist Vice-Chairman Chan King-ming by winning 204 to 81 votes. Sin Chung-kai and Tik Chi-yuen from Ho's team also elected Vice-Chairmen with 180 and 170 votes respectively, defeating Cosmas Kwong Kwok-chuen the Young Turk reformist, Andrew Fung Wai-kwong of the Meeting Point faction, and Shirley Ho Suk-ping supported by legislator and founding Chairman Martin Lee Chu-ming and legislator Andrew Cheng Kar-foo. 26 of the 27 mainstreamers candidates were elected except for Chiu Chung-lam, chairman of the Kowloon East branch. Andrew Fung was the single candidate of the Meeting Point faction who was elected to the Central Committee. The seven reformist members were all defeated.

The elected members of the 7th Central Committee are listed as following:
Chairman: Albert Ho
Vice-Chairmen: Sin Chung-kai, Tik Chi-yuen
Secretary: Peggy Ha
Treasurer: Cheung Yin-tung
Executive Committee Members:

 Chan Ka-wai
 Josephine Chan Shu-ying
 Howard Lam Tsz-kin
 Law Chi-kwong
 Lee Wing-tat
 Ng Wing-fai
 Szeto Wah
 Tsui Hon-kwong
 Wong Sing-chi
 Yeung Sum

Central Committee Members:

 Chai Man-hon
 Cheung Yuet-lan
 Fung Wai-kwong
 Kwong Chun-yu
 Lam Wing-yin
 Law Chun-ngai
 Lee Shiu-man
 Joanna Leung Suk-ching
 Mark Li Kin-yin
 Mok Siu-lun
 Ng Kim-sing
 James To Kun-sun
 Wong Kin-shing
 Wu Chi-wai
 Yuen Bun-keung

Aftermath
The newly elected Chairman Albert Ho said his team won because the party members understood that they were in crisis and needed a strong leadership. He called for the intra-party solidarity.

Political scientist Ivan Choy commented that the election results showed the loss of trust between the mainstreamers and reformists. The New Territories East branch which the reformists dominated would confront the party's central authorities. That might lead to another split if the conflicts continued and bad election results came out badly in the district council elections next year.

References

Political party leadership elections in Hong Kong
Democratic Party (Hong Kong)
2006 in Hong Kong
2006 elections in China
Democratic Party (HK) leadership election